was a Japanese poet raised in Ise, in the Mie Prefecture of Shima Province on the island of Honshu, Japan. He traveled throughout the country composing poems and helped lead the Matsuo Bashō revival movement of the eighteenth century.

Childhood
Miura grew up in Shima province with an older sister and a younger brother. His father left his family during Chora's childhood, so his mother took over control of the family. She never remarried and raised her children by herself. Chora was home-schooled as a child. Being neighbors with the Taniguchi family, Chora was close friends with Yosa Buson. They met when Buson was 20 years old, and both admired Matsuo Bashō and Kobayashi Issa.

Adulthood and death
In an article for the periodical Early Modern Japan, Cheryl Crowley wrote, "Chora . . . studied with disciples of Bakurin, a leader of a rural Bashō school. Chora was a successful haikai master with numerous students, although he had a reputation for being irresponsible and profligate in his ways. He spent several years in Kyoto in the early part of the 1770s, and his work frequently appears in sequences composed by Buson and his colleagues around this time."  In addition, R.H. Blyth notes that “Ryoto had set up the Ise School, followed by Otsuya and others, but gradually it became worldly. He worked together with poets such as Yosa Buson (1716-1783), Takai Kitô (1741-1789), and Wada Ranzan (d.1773). Chora brought it back to the poetry and simplicity of Matsuo Bashō.” 

Chora was struck with serious leukemia and died on September 4, 1780.

Sample poems
Haiku

Watching the stars
through willow branches
makes me feel lonely.

A storm-wind blows
Out from among the grasses
A full moon grows

at the ancient shrine
tarnished gold-foil... and green leaves
awakening time

insects
scattering in the grasses—
sound-colours

Kasen Renga

During his life, Chora participated in many collaboratively written poems called haikai no renga, especially the 36-verse form known as kasen.  He helped write the following kasen titled "Susuki Mitsu" ("Seeing Micanthus" or "Having Seen Pampas Grass") along with the poets Buson, Kitô, and Ranzan.  It was later published in the Japanese anthology Kono hotori--Ichi-ya shi-kasen (この辺り一夜四歌仙).

Adaptations
Ronald Caltabiano (1959-) used one of Chora's haiku in his song "First Dream of Honeysuckle Petals Falling Alone," composed in 1978 for mezzo-soprano and piano.

References

1729 births
1780 deaths
Japanese writers of the Edo period
18th-century Japanese poets
Japanese haiku poets